Apis cerana japonica is a subspecies of the eastern honey bee native to Japan. This subspecies was determined, through an analysis of mitochondrial DNA, to have originally come from the Korean peninsula. They have been observed moving into urban areas in the absence of natural predators.

A. c. japonica is very resistant to the mite Varroa jacobsoni, which is commonly found among A. cerana. It is also able to adapt to weather extremes, has a long flight duration and is less likely to sting than the western counterpart. 

3-Hydroxyoctanoic acid is a signalling chemical emitted by the orchid Cymbidium floribundum and is recognized by Japanese honeybees.

Use in apiculture 

Beekeepers in Japan attempted to introduce western honey bees (Apis mellifera) for the sake of their high productivity. However, western honey bees have no innate defense against Asian giant hornets, which can rapidly destroy their colonies. Japanese honey bees, having evolved alongside the Asian giant hornet, have numerous defensive strategies against the hornets and so are also used in apiculture in the country.

Hive 
Nest cavity ranges from 10 to 15 liters with a round comb structure that tends to be uneven. A. c. japonica will also dismantle an old hive before moving on to a new one.

Pollination 
A. c. japonica pollinates the endangered orchids Cymbidium kanran and Cymbidium goeringii despite not having nectar for the bees to collect, instead releasing pheromones used to orient forager bees returning to the hive as a deception tactic in order to be pollinated.

Dancing 
A. c. japonica, like many other honey bees, dance in order to inform nestmates of locations for "effective flower resources". However, unlike other honey bees, they do not dance for the location of propolis.

A. c. japonica also perform short waggle dances after their nest has been scouted by hornets or other competing bees in addition to hive smearing to facilitate the protection of the nest.

Protective behaviors 
When threatened by hornets or other competing honey bees, A. c. japonica will dance and smear plant material at the entrance of the hive. A threat consists of a hornet or competing bee arriving to the home nest and scouting it, smearing it with pheromones. Performing the dance triggers an emergency, bees will travel a short distance to gather plant material. A. c. japonica does not discriminate between plant texture, color, or the part of the plant. The bees will then stand at the hive entrance and chew up the plant to smear the juice over the entrance.

A. c. japonica has a well-known defensive behavior when dealing with hornets which no other honeybee displays. Although a handful of Asian giant hornets can easily defeat the uncoordinated defenses of a honey bee colony, the Japanese honey bee (Apis cerana japonica) has an effective strategy.

As a hornet enters the hive, a mob of hundreds of honey bees surrounds it in a ball, completely covering it and preventing it from reacting effectively. The bees violently vibrate their flight muscles in much the same way as they do to heat the hive in cold conditions. In addition, the exertions of the honey bees raise the level of carbon dioxide (CO2) in the ball. Some bees do die along with the intruder, much as happens when they attack other intruders with their stings, but by killing the hornet scout, they prevent it from summoning reinforcements that would wipe out the entire colony.

Although it is a commonly accepted theory that the Asian giant hornet may be allowed to enter the Japanese honey bee hive, recent studies suggest that the Japanese honey bee and large hornets actually have a predator-prey “I see you” (ISY) relationship.  The ISY relationship is supported by the observation that Japanese honey bee wingbeats become louder and increase in intensity as a bee-hawking wasp (such as an Asian hornet (Vespa velutina), a Lesser banded hornet (Vespa affinis), Japanese yellow hornet (Vespa simillima xanthoptera), or an Asian giant hornet (Vespa mandarinia)) moves closer to the entrance of the hive and that, in most cases, the hornet may retreat when it hears the sound. If the hornet moves closer to the hive, the Japanese honey bees move their wings faster to intensify the warning to the wasp. If the wasp enters the nest the bees will increase their wing movement, form a ball and raise their body temperature.

References

External links

cerana japonica
Insects of Japan

ja:ミツバチ